The Adventures of Peter Simple is a British period adventure television series which aired in six parts on BBC 1 in 1957. It stars Timothy Bateson in the title role, a midshipman in the Royal Navy at the time of the Napoleonic Wars. It is based on the 1834 novel Peter Simple by Frederick Marryat.

Other actors who appeared in the series include Sam Kydd, Ronald Adam, Patrick Cargill, Nadia Cattouse, Barry Letts, Andre Charisse, Rosamund Greenwood, André Maranne, John Phillips, Kynaston Reeves, Sally Travers, George Woodbridge, Wilfrid Brambell, Peter Bull, Robert Raglan and Willoughby Goddard.

Main cast
 Timothy Bateson as  Peter Simple
 Thomas Heathcote as Terence O'Brien
 Evelyn Cordeau as Celeste
 Michael Goodliffe as Peter's Uncle
 John Serret as  Colonel O'Brien

References

Bibliography
Ellen Baskin. Serials on British Television, 1950-1994. Scolar Press, 1996.

External links
 

BBC television dramas
1957 British television series debuts
1957 British television series endings
English-language television shows